Liotella johnstoni is a species of minute sea snail, a marine gastropod mollusc in the family Skeneidae.

Description
The diameter of the shell attains 1.3 mm.

Distribution
This marine species is endemic to Australia and occurs off New South Wales, Victoria, South Australia and Tasmania.

References

 Beddome, C.E. 1882. Description of some marine shells of Tasmania. Pap. Proc. R. Soc. Tas. Vol. 1882 pp. 167–170
 Laseron, C. 1954. Revision of the Liotiidae of New South Wales. Aust. Zool. Vol. 12 (1) pp. 1–25, figs 1-49a
 Cotton, B. C., 1959. South Australian Mollusca. Archaeogastropoda. W.L. Hawes, Adelaide.. 44 9 pp., 1 pl.
 Iredale, T. & McMichael, D.F. (1962). A reference list of the marine Mollusca of New South Wales. Memoirs of the Australian Museum. 11 : 1-109

External links
 Seashells of New South Wales: Liotella johnstoni

johnstoni
Gastropods of Australia
Gastropods described in 1883